Heinz Kisters (born 1912; died 1977 in Kreuzlingen) was a German entrepreneur, art dealer and art collector.

Life 
Trained as a high-frequency engineer, Kisters was successful as an art dealer, selling notably to Konrad Adenauer. He assembled an extensive art collection of old masters, as well as uncertain attributions. 

The "Heinz Kisters Foundation" continues in Kreuzlingen. 

The collection includes works by Sandro Botticelli, Lucas Cranach the Elder, Gerard David, Anton van Dyck, Jean Honoré Fragonard, Esteban Murillo, Peter Paul Rubens, Hans Schäufelein, Jan van Scorel, Bernardo Strozzi, Jacopo Tintoretto, Tiziano Vecellio, Diego Velázquez, Merten van Heemskerk and other masters. It is thus an important private collection of Old German, Old Dutch as well as early Italian painting, Venetian Cinquecento and Spanish painting of the 17th century.

The auction of a Titian painting in 2011 caused a sensation on the art market.

Criticism 
Heinz Kisters was the lifelong art dealer and advisor to German Chancellor Konrad Adenauer. Adenauer met Kisters in 1950 through the Cologne banker Robert Pferdmenges. Heinz Kisters supplied Adenauer with artworks he attributed to  Aert van der Neer, Anthonis van Dijck, Palma Vecchio, Nicolaes Maes and Bartholomaeus Bruyn. However, the artists were thought to be student or workshops. Some attributions were based on appraisals paid after Kisters' purchase. The fact that other experts came to substantially different judgments was mentioned at most in the footnotes. 

When Adenauer died in April 1967, his sons commissioned the then director of the Bayerische Staatsgemäldesammlung to review the collection and give an expert opinion. According to the journalist Koldehoff, this appraisal amounted to 469,000 D-marks, which was far below what was expected for a collection of works by El Greco and Cranach. The appraisal, which was supported by material analyses from the Doerner Institute, forced Kisters to buy back 19 paintings for 950,000 D-marks. These works, together with other works from Kisters' possession, were put up for auction at Christie's in London. The 36 paintings for sale were expected to fetch 6 million D-marks, but only 5 of them were sold for a sum of 156,000 D-marks. Individual works, however, were later auctioned off at higher prices.

In an interview, Konrad Adenauer's grandson, whose own name is Konrad Adenauer, said of Kisters:

"My father never trusted Kisters. He was regarded by the Adenauers as a gray but obscure eminence. Kisters was like a secret name in the family: "Kisters was back," they would say. No one really knew what was behind it, but everyone knew that it had great significance for my grandfather. He was a kind of myth. Kisters haunted the conversations, but what the two of them were up to, no one knew. Skepticism was always present on the part of the children. After the death, that skepticism was confirmed."

Literature 

 Peter Strieder (Bearb.), Sammlung Heinz Kisters. Altdeutsche und Altniederländische Gemälde, Katalog der Ausstellung Nürnberg / Münster, Nürnberg 1963
 Sammlung Heinz Kisters, In: Kunstchronik Heft 8, 1963 (Katalognachtrag)
 Oscar Sandner (Bearb.), Meisterwerke der Malerei aus Privatsammlungen im Bodenseegebiet. Katalog der Ausstellung in Bregenz 1965
 Thomas Onken (Bearb.), Meisterwerke aus der Sammlung Heinz Kisters, Katalog der Ausstellung in Kreuzlingen 1971
 Dieter Koepplin und T. Falk (Bearb.), Lucas Cranach. Gemälde, Zeichnungen und Druckgraphik, Katalog der Ausstellung in Basel 1974
 Highly important pictures from the collection formed by the late Chancellor Konrad Adenauer, the property of Heinz Kisters, Esq. and others. Christie, Manson & Woods,  London  26. Juni 1970.
 Sotheby´s Auktionskatalog, 19th Century European Paintings, Frühjahr 2011

References

External links 
 Artikel auf Webseite Die Welt: Der Mann, der Adenauer betrog
 Artikel auf Webseite BBC News: Titian Madonna and Child sells for record $16.9m
 Der Standard: Heinz Kisters. Der Mann bei dem Konrad Adenauer Kunst kaufte
 Onken [Hg.): Meisterwerke aus der Sammlung Heinz Kisters. 1971.

1977 deaths
1912 births
20th-century German businesspeople
German art collectors
German art dealers